Rex Garner was a British born actor and director. He was born in 1921 in Wolverhampton, England. He died 17 May 2015 at the age of 94. Garner was survived by his seven children: Nicolas Garner, Lindsay Garner, Christopher Garner, Geraldine Raper (née Garner) Sally Garner-Gibbons, Kerry Garner, and Kim Garner, and his ex-wife Tammy Garner.

Among his many British TV appearances he co-starred in My Wife and I. In 1968 he went to South Africa to join the Academy Theatre, and settled there in 1974. In 1979 joined Pieter Toerien acting and directing plays until 1999. In 1981 he was the director of Tommie Meyer's film "Birds of Paradise". He returned to the UK in the early 2000s.

He was named the best actor in 1983 at the Fleur du Cap Theatre Awards for his role as Father Tim in Mass Appeal.

References

External links
 
 

20th-century British male actors
1921 births
2015 deaths
Actors from Wolverhampton
British male stage actors
British male television actors